Brigitte Baumeister (born 19 October 1946) is a German politician (CDU) and former member of the German Bundestag.

Life 
She was a member of the German Bundestag from 20 December 1990 to 17 October 2002 (three terms). After studying mathematics at the University of Stuttgart, Baumeister worked for IBM Germany and was a lecturer in medical informatics at the Heilbronn University of Applied Sciences. In 1992 she replaced Walther Leisler Kiep as CDU treasurer.

References 

1946 births
Living people
Members of the Bundestag for Baden-Württemberg
Members of the Bundestag 1998–2002
Members of the Bundestag 1994–1998
Members of the Bundestag 1990–1994
Female members of the Bundestag
20th-century German women politicians
21st-century German women politicians
Members of the Bundestag for the Christian Democratic Union of Germany